Farallón Island is an islet belonging to Uruguay, located on the Río de la Plata near the city of Colonia del Sacramento. It is notable for its lighthouse.

Farallón and nearby San Gabriel Island have been declared National Monument.

References

External links

River islands of Uruguay
Islands of the Río de la Plata
Geography of Colonia Department